This is a partial list of Czech sportspeople. For the full plain list of Czech sportspeople on Wikipedia, see :Category:Czech sportspeople.

Alpine skiing
Olga Charvátová
Petra Kurková
Ester Ledecká
Šárka Strachová
Šárka Záhrobská

Athletics
Jaroslav Bába
Tomáš Dvořák
Arie Gill-Glick (1930-2016), Israeli Olympic runner
Jitka Harazimova, professional bodybuilder
Zuzana Hejnová
Šárka Kašpárková
Jarmila Kratochvílová
Věra Pospíšilová-Cechlová
Roman Šebrle
Barbora Špotáková
Olga Winterberg, Israeli Olympian in the discus throw
Emil Zátopek
Jan Železný

Basketball 
Kamila Vodičková, basketball player

Bat and ball sports 
Pavel Masek, softball
Jakub Sládek, baseball

Biathlon
Jiřína Adamičková-Pelcová
Roman Dostál
Kateřina Holubcová
Jan Matouš
Ondřej Moravec
Gabriela Soukalová
Jaroslav Soukup
Michal Šlesingr
Jana Vápeníková
Zdeněk Vítek
Veronika Vítková

Boxing
Rudolf Kraj

Canoeing

Martin Doktor
Josef Dostál
Filip Dvořák
Daniel Havel
Štěpánka Hilgertová
Josef Holeček
Vavřinec Hradilek
Marek Jiras
Bohuslav Karlík
Tereza Kneblova
Martin Kolanda
Tomáš Máder
Lukáš Pollert
Jiří Rohan
Miroslav Šimek
Ondřej Štěpánek
Jan Štěrba
Lukáš Trefil
Jaroslav Volf

Chess 
Vera Menchik, chess player
Richard Réti, chess player
Wilhelm Steinitz, first World Chess Champion

Climbing 
Radek Jaroš, mountain climber
Adam Ondra, rock climber
Josef Rakoncaj, mountain climber

Cross-country skiing

Lukáš Bauer
Pavel Benc
Martin Jakš
Květa Jeriová
Václav Korunka
Martin Koukal
Jiří Magál
Kateřina Neumannová
Radim Nyč
Blanka Paulů
Gabriela Svobodová
Helena Šikolová
Ladislav Švanda
Dagmar Švubová

Curling
Jakub Bareš
Jindřich Kitzberger
Jiří Snítil
Martin Snítil

Cycling
Jana Horáková
Jaroslav Kulhavý
Roman Kreuziger, road bicycle race
Romana Labounková

Darts 
 Pavel Korda

Figure skating
Petr Barna
Michal Březina
Hana Mašková
Tomáš Verner

Football

Martin Bačík
Milan Baroš
Patrik Berger
Josef Bican
Petr Čech
Miroslav Ceplák
Vladimír Chaloupka
Jaroslav Chlebek
Martin Chorý
Zdeněk Cieslar
Radim Ditrich
Pavel Elšík
František Fadrhonc, football manager
Petr Filipský
Jan Hála
Eva Haniaková
Pavel Harazim
Lukáš Hlavatý
Petr Holota
Dan Houdek
Michal Houžvička
Jiří Huška
Bohumil Jelínek
Vladislav Jelínek
Ladislav Jetel
Václav Ježek, manager
František Jirásek
David Jukl
Josef Just
Vlastimil Karal
Václav Klán
Zdeněk Klesnil
Vašek Klouda
Jan Koller
Jan Kosak
Petr Kostelník
Martin Kotyza
Jan Kozel, coach
Lukáš Křeček
Lenka Krömrová
Jiří Krystan
Radek Kuděla
Aneta Kulichová
Tomáš Kunc
Lukáš Landovský
Jaroslava Lorencová
Andrei Lushnikov
Ondřej Lysoněk
Pavel Macháček
Milan Machalický
Ctibor Malý
Lukáš Marek
Jan Martykán
Jaroslav Marx
Josef Masopust, manager
Lukáš Matyska
Lukáš Michal
Lukáš Michna
Pavel Nedvěd
Lukáš Nechvátal
Zdeněk Nehoda
Oldřich Nejedlý 
Daniel Nešpor
Michal Ondráček
Jan Palinek
Antonín Panenka
Michal Pávek
Václav Pavlis
Jan Penc
Jiří Petrů
Jiří Perůtka
David Petrus
František Plánička
Karel Poborský
Antonín Presl
Martin Psohlavec
Jiří Ptáček
Tomáš Rosický
Aleš Ryška
Martin Sigmund
Jaromír Šilhán
Vladimír Šmicer
David Sourada
Antonín Spěvák
Michal Šrom
Václav Sršeň
Marcel Šťastný
Tomáš Stráský
Vít Štětina
Jiří Studík
Marcel Švejdík
Martin Ticháček, coach and former player
Petr Tomašák
Dalibor Vašenda
Radim Vlasák
Evžen Vohák
Václav Winter
Ivo Zbožínek
Petr Zieris

Freestyle skiing
Stanley Hayer
Tomáš Kraus
Nikola Sudová
Aleš Valenta

Golf 
Jessica Korda, American golfer; older daughter of Petr Korda
Nelly Korda, American golfer; younger daughter of Petr Korda

Gymnastics
Věra Čáslavská

Handball
Filip Jícha
Hana Mučková

Ice hockey

Tomáš Bartejs
Jakub Bartoň
Martin Belay
Josef Beránek
Lukáš Bláha
Daniel Boháč
Jan Bojer
Radek Bonk
Daniel Branda
Martin Buček
Jan Bulis
Petr Čajánek
Jan Čaloun
Zdeněk Čáp
Filip Čech
Roman Čechmánek
Jiří Charousek
Roman Chlouba
Lukáš Cikánek
Radek Číp
Tomas Csabi
Adam Dlouhý
Martin Dočekal
Jiří Dopita
Vlastimil Dostálek
Michal Dragoun
Jan Dresler
Jiří Drtina
Miroslav Duben
Martin Dudáš
Jan Dufek
Tomáš Dujsík
Ivan Ďurač
Filip Dvořák (born 1976)
Filip Dvořák (born 1997)
Patrik Eliáš
Lukáš Endál
Martin Erat
Jiří Ferebauer
Tomáš Ficenc
Lukáš Finsterle
Jiří Fischer
Patrik Flašar
Martin Fous
Jakub Fúzik
Ladislav Gengel
Sebastian Gorčík
Tomáš Gřeš
Jan Hammerbauer
Roman Hamrlík
Dominik Hašek
Jiří Hašek
Milan Hejduk
Aleš Hemský
Martin Heřman
Milan Hnilička
Bobby Holík
Daniel Hora
Jiří Hozak
Jan Hranáč
Dominik Hrníčko
Jan Hucl
Patrik Husák
Jakub Illéš
Jaromír Jágr
Jaroslav Jágr
Richard Jareš
Jiří Jebavý
Martin Jenáček
Petr Jíra
Tomáš Jiránek
Vít Jonák
František Kaberle
Tomáš Kaberle
Kryštof Kafan
Jordan Karagavrilidis
Tomáš Karpov
Petr Kica
Lukáš Klimeš
Jakub Kolář
Kristián Kolář
Jakub Kotala
Aleš Kotalík
Petr Kousalík
Vojtěch Kubinčák
Róbert Krajči
Tomáš Kramný
David Krejčí
Lukáš Krejčík
Richard Kristl
Lukáš Kříž
Filip Kuba
Karel Kubát
Vladislav Kubeš
Pavel Kubina
František Kučera
Jiří Kučný
Martin Kupec
Jiří Kurka
Jaroslav Kůs
Robert Lang
Ondřej Látal
Petr Leška
Marek Loskot
Petr Mainer
Marek Malík
Ondřej Malinský
Jakub Marek
Rostislav Marosz
Ondřej Martinka
Jiří Matějíček
Jakub Maxa
Martin Mazanec
Milan Michálek
Lukáš Mičulka
Radek Míka
Milan Mikulík
Pavel Mojžíš
David Moravec
Tomáš Nádašdi
Václav Nedomanský
Petr Nedvěd
Michal Nedvídek
Roman Němeček
Viktor Nestrašil
Tomáš Nouza
Jiří Novotný
Rostislav Olesz
Jiří Ondrušek
Dominik Pacovský
Tomáš Pastor
Pavel Patera
Michal Pavel
Antonín Pechanec
Radek Philipp
Karel Plášek
Jan Plodek
Martin Podešva
Jiří Polák
Petr Polodna
Patrik Poulíček
Lukáš Poživil
Libor Procházka
Martin Procházka
Milan Procházka
Ondřej Procházka
Roman Prošek
Václav Prospal
Tomáš Protivný
Petr Průcha
Jiří Půhoný
Lukáš Pulpán
Marek Račuk
David Rangl
Robert Reichel
Martin Rejthar
Lukáš Rindoš
Martin Ručinský
Adam Rufer
Vladimír Růžička
Martin Rýgl
Jiří Rys
Dušan Salfický
Michal Šeda
Daniel Skalický
Vladimír Škoda
Josef Skořepa
Miroslav Škumát
Bohumil Slavíček
Robert Slávik
Jiří Šlégr
Richard Šmehlík
Rostislav Šnajnar
Jaroslav Špaček
Patrik Štefan
Jakub Stehlík
Ondřej Stehlík
Jiří Stejskal
Petr Stloukal
Filip Stoklasa
Martin Straka
Vladimir Stransky
Matěj Stříteský
Jakub Strnad
Tomáš Štůrala
Ondřej Švaňhal
Filip Švaříček
Petr Svoboda
Petr Sýkora
Tomáš Sýkora
Dominik Tejnor
Jiří Tlustý
Milan Toman
Vojtěch Tomi
Jakub Trefný
Miroslav Třetina
Filip Turek
Michal Tvrdík
Lukáš Vařecha
Jaroslav Vlach
Roman Vlach
Milan Vobořil
Tomáš Vokoun
Lukáš Volf
Tomáš Vondráček
Jakub Voráček
Lubomír Vosátko
David Výborný
Martin Vyrůbalík
Jan Wasserbauer
Ondrej Weissmann
Michael Zacpálek
Martin Záhorovský
Lukáš Žalčík
Marek Židlický
Pavel Zubíček

Martial arts
Jaromír Ježek, judoka
Vladimír Kocman, judoka
Lukáš Krpálek, judoka
Andrea Pažoutová, judoka
Karlos Vemola, mixed martial artist, first Czech-born UFC fighter
Josef Věnsek, judoka
Jiří Procházka, first ever Czech-born UFC champion

Modern Pentathlon
Libor Capalini
David Svoboda

Motorsports 
Tomáš Enge, Grand Prix race car driver
Eliška Junková, Formula One driver

Polo 
Kurt Epstein, Olympic water polo player

Rowing
Jakub Hanák
David Jirka
Tomáš Karas
Miroslava Knapková
David Kopřiva
Ondřej Synek

Sailing
Lenka Šmídová

Shooting
Kateřina Emmons
David Kostelecký
Petr Málek
Lenka Marušková
Adéla Sýkorová
Martin Tenk

Ski jumping
Rudolf Burkert
Tomáš Goder
František Jež
Jiří Malec
Jiří Parma
Pavel Ploc
Jiří Raška
Jaroslav Sakala

Snowboarding
Ester Ledecká
Šárka Pančochová
Eva Samková

Speed Skating
Martina Sáblíková

Swimming

František Getreuer (1906–1945), swimmer and Olympic water polo player, killed in Dachau concentration camp
Pavol Steiner (1908–1969), Olympic water polo player, swimmer, and cardiac surgeon
Yvonne Tobis (born 1948), Israeli Olympic swimmer

Table tennis
Gertrude "Traute" Kleinová, 3-time table tennis world champion

Tennis

Tomáš Berdych
František Čermák
Martin Damm
Jaroslav Drobný
Leoš Friedl
Ladislav Hecht (1909–2004), Czechoslovak-American tennis player 
Andrea Hlaváčková
Lucie Hradecká
Jiří Javorský
Jan Kodeš
Petr Korda
Sebastian Korda, American tennis player; son of Petr Korda
Jan Koželuh
Karel Koželuh
Richard Krajicek
Petra Kvitová
Ivan Lendl, Czech-American
Hana Mandlíková, Czech-Australian
Regina Maršíková
Iveta Melzer
Martina Navratilova, Czech-American
Karel Nováček
Jana Novotná
Květa Peschke
Karolína Plíšková
Kateřina Siniaková 
Pavel Složil
Cyril Suk
Helena Suková
Věra Suková
Tomáš Šmíd
Radek Štěpánek
Renáta Tomanová
Daniel Vacek
Nicole Vaidišová

Triathlon
Kateřina Dudková
Hana Kolarova
Jan Řehula

Volleyball
Ivana Cebáková
Svetlana Cenkova
Matyáš Jachnicki
Adam Kozák
Leona Neumannová
Kamila Spáčilová

Water polo

Pavol Steiner (1908–1969), Olympic water polo player, swimmer, and cardiac surgeon
František Getreuer (1906–1945), swimmer and Olympic water polo player, killed in Dachau concentration camp

See also
Sport in the Czech Republic
Czech Republic at the Olympics
Czech Republic at the Paralympics

Czech Republic
 
Sports